Renfrewshire Law Centre, or RLC, is a West Scottish local community-based charitable law centre that offers services to the people of Renfrewshire and surrounding areas of West Central Scotland, often free of charge. Established in 1998 as Paisley Law Centre, it relaunched in 2008 as Renfrewshire Law Centre. With its head office in Paisley, a large town forming part of the conurbation of Greater Glasgow, RLC has the largest geographical catchment area of any community law centre in Scotland, and takes cases from Paisley, Renfrew, Johnstone, Bishopton, Bridge of Weir, Brookfield, Elderslie, Erskine, Houston, Howwood, Inchinnan, Kilbarchan, Langbank, Linwood, Lochwinnoch, as well as from other areas beyond Renfrewshire itself.

A member of the Scottish Association of Law Centres, RLC is a progressive law project, active in social welfare, human rights and public law. Constitutionally, it is a democratic organisation, inviting other local organisations to propose members for appointment to its board of directors, all volunteers, who represent the interests of the community and steer RLC's casework in accordance with local needs.

In common with other law centres, RLC strives to reclaim justice for the people, rather than using the legal system for private profit. Operating under the banner of Meeting Unmet Legal Need, it puts the law to work in tackling issues of social hardship in contentious matters like housing, homelessness, consumer affairs, employment disputes, community care and children's rights. RLC also engages in legal education through various means, such as a volunteer program and free seminars.

The Scottish Association of Law Centres is the equivalent in Scotland to the Law Centres Federation in England and Wales, of which it is also an associate member.

Other prominent law centres in Scotland include Castlemilk Law & Money Advice Centre, Dundee Law Centre, Drumchapel Law & Money Advice Centre, East End Law Centre, Ethnic Minorities Law Centre, Environmental Law Centre, Fife Law Centre, Govan Law Centre, and Legal Services Agency.

Source: Scottish Association of Law Centres.

References

External links
  RLC website
  Scotsman article on RLC campaign to reduce court costs, 16 July 2007
  Glasgow Herald article on crisis in Glaswegian social housing, 2 April 2004
  Law Society Journal article on welfare benefits appeals, 7 October 2004
  Sunday Mirror article on advertising scam, 17 July 2004
  Paisley Daily Express article on monster debts, 31 August 2009
  Paisley Daily Express article on unlawful eviction, 25 May 2009
  Paisley Daily Express article on RLC anti-eviction action, 13 April 2009

Legal organisations based in Scotland
Renfrewshire
1998 establishments in Scotland